Estrella Guía (English: Guiding Star), also released as Estrela Guia for its Brazilian edition, is the third studio album by Brazilian singer Alexandre Pires, released on 18 March 2003 though EMI and BGM. The album was produced by Juan Vicente Zambrano, Danilo Ballo, Emanuele Ruffinengo, Julio Reyes, Rey Nerio, Alexandre Pires, Pedro Ferreira, Rudy Pérez, Antonio Carmona and Fernando Illan and features collaborations with Spanish singers Alejandro Sanz and Rosario. It is the second album by Pires to be released in Spanish, the first one being Alexandre Pires (2001), also released as É Por Amor.

At the 4th Annual Latin Grammy Awards, the album received nominations for Album of the Year and Best Male Pop Vocal Album, at the ceremony Pires performed a Spanish-English version of the song "Amame" alongside American singer Kelly Clarkson. The album was also nominated for Pop Album of the Year at the Premio Lo Nuestro 2004.

The album appeared on the Billboard Top Latin Albums and Billboard Latin Pop Albums charts, peaking at positions twelve and six respectively.

Background
The album was recorded during eleven months in different studios in Europe, United States and Brazil. It features collaborations with two Spanish singers, Alejandro Sanz in the song "Sólo Que Me Falta" and Rosario in "Inseguridad", about the songs Pires said that "the album is not a Spanish flavored one, those are only two different moments, every song of the album has a different flavour and color, I think we achieved it", he also said that the songs from the album dwell on the "daily life of people". The album also includes a version of Gino Vanelli's 1978 song "I Just Wanna Stop", released under the title "Es Mejor Parar" in the Spanish edition and "É Melhor Parar" in the Brazilian one.

Singles
The album spawned three singles, "Amame", released on 11 January 2003, "Quietémonos la Ropa", released on 3 May 2003, and "En el Silencio Negro de la Noche", released on 13 September 2003, all three songs charted on the Hot Latin Songs and Latin Pop Songs charts, both by Billboard, "Amame" at number 2 in both, "Quietemonos la Ropa" at 3 and 8, and "En el Silencio Negro de la Noche" at 24 and 14, respectively. Additionally, though "Amame" did not enter the Billboard Hot 100, it peaked at number 14 on the Bubbling Under Hot 100, being Pires' only appearance at the chart.

Critical reception

Thom Jurek from AllMusic gave the album two and a half stars out of five writing that the album was "beautifully executed but generic nonetheless" commenting that while Pires was a great vocalist, when he sung in Spanish "the depth of his emotional expression is somewhat stilted", however, Jurek highlighted the two duets in the project as the album's "two most successful moments".

Track listing

Charts

Certifications

References

2003 albums
Alexandre Pires albums